Gyula Németh is the name of:

 Gyula Németh (linguist) (1890–1976), Hungarian linguist and turkologist 
 Gyula Németh (high jumper) (born 1959), Hungarian high jumper
 Gyula Németh (long jumper) (born 1950), Hungarian long jumper